Grapefruit is an artist's book written by Yoko Ono, originally published in 1964. It has become famous as an early example of conceptual art, containing a series of "event scores" that replace the physical work of art – the traditional stock-in-trade of artists – with instructions that an individual may, or may not, wish to enact.

Origins of the event score 

Event scores were developed by a number of artists attending John Cage's experimental music composition classes at the New School for Social Research in New York. Whilst Ono did not attend these informal lessons, her husband at the time, Ichiyanagi Toshi (an experimental musician), did and Toshi and Ono became regulars of Cage's circle of friends by 1959. Other members of this group included David Tudor, Morton Feldman, Richard Maxfield and Merce Cunningham. Invention of the event score is usually credited to George Brecht, but La Monte Young and Yoko Ono are also cited as amongst the first to experiment with the form. Both Cage and Brecht were deeply influenced by "Oriental thinking", and Ono found that her Buddhist-inspired work was, almost accidentally, fêted by the emerging New York counterculture as avant-garde.

Evolution of the book
Often considered a Fluxus artwork, in fact the work was originally published by Ono's own imprint, Wunternaum Press, in Tokyo in an edition of 500. After leaving New York in 1962 – where she had exhibited at Maciunas' AG Gallery, amongst others – her then-husband Anthony Cox suggested she collect her scores together. George Maciunas, the central personality in Fluxus, had apparently been trying to reach her in Tokyo with the aim of printing a similar book in New York, as part of his series of Fluxkits (see Water Yam), but his letters had not reached her; she sent some of the scores and a prepublication advertisement to be published in his Fluxus newspaper in February 1964 when contact was finally established.

First edition
The name Grapefruit was chosen as title because Ono believed the grapefruit to be a hybrid of an orange and a lemon, and thus a reflection of herself as "a spiritual hybrid". It also seems likely that it is a playful allusion to Brecht's Water Yam, itself a pun on Brecht and Watt's Yam Festival, which, culminating in a series of events and performances in May 1963, had been derived from "May" backwards.

The first edition that was published in 1964 in Japan by Wunternaum Press created by Yoko Ono, contains over 150 "instruction works"; virtually all are in English, with about a third translated into Japanese. They are divided into five sections: Music, Painting, Event, Poetry and Object. The instructions are preceded by dedications to figures including John Cage, La Monte Young, Nam June Paik, Isamu Noguchi and Peggy Guggenheim, and also includes documentation relating to Ono's recent exhibitions and performances. The work was originally sold for $3.00 before publication, $6.00 after.

1964

Wunternaum Press. Tokyo, Japan (Paperback)

Subsequent editions
The second edition was published in 1970 by Simon & Schuster in New York, Peter Owen Ltd in London, and Bärmeier & Nikel in Frankfurt. As well as an introduction by John Lennon ("Hi! My name is John Lennon. I'd like you to meet Yoko Ono ..." In the 2000 reissue of Lennon's 1964 book, In His Own Write, Ono wrote a similar introduction), the work contained 80 more instruction pieces, and included two more sections, Film and Dance. The book ends with a collection of Ono's writings including To The Wesleyan People, 1966. Paperback editions were issued by Sphere and Touchstone around the same time, and a reprint by Simon & Schuster in 2000. The Sphere edition has a memorable sleeve, conflating the title with Yoko Ono's film Bottoms, (or no. 4), a film composed exclusively of naked bottoms, made in 1966.

1970

Bärmeier & Nikel. Frankfurt am Main, Germany

Peter Owen. London, UK

Simon & Schuster. New York, USA (Hardcover with dust jacket)

POMELO. Ediciones de la Flor. Buenos Aires, Argentina

1971 

Sphere Books. London, UK

Simon & Schuster. New York, USA (Paperback)

TouchStone Book, USA

2000

Simon & Schuster. New York, USA

Bakhåll. Sweden

2004 

PAMPLEMOUSSE. Textuel. France

2005

GRAPEFRUIT. INSTRUZIONE PER L'ARTE E PER LA VITA. Mondadori. Italy

2006

POMELO. Centro de Creación Experimental. Cuenca, Spain

2015

Museum of Modern Art. New York, USA. (Facsimile of first edition in slip case.)

Planned sequel
Grapefruit II was planned as a sequel. It is mentioned once in Grapefruit and had a pre-publication price of $5 and a post-release price of $10. It was planned to be released in 1966 and is currently unreleased. Ono stated that it would contain 150 new pieces not featured in Grapefruit, including her "touch poems".

Some of the scores
PIECES FOR ORCHESTRA

COUGH PIECE

CLOUD PIECE

PAINTING TO EXIST ONLY WHEN IT'S COPIED OR PHOTOGRAPHED

PAINTING TO BE CONSTRUCTED IN YOUR HEAD

SNOW PIECE

TUNAFISH SANDWICH PIECE

PAINTING TO BE STEPPED ON

Sequel: Acorn (2013)
 In July 2013, Ono released Grapefruit'''s sequel, called Acorn, another book of "instructional poems".

References

External links
Interview with Ono about Fluxus
Another Interview with Ono
Some Instruction Pieces
Acorn (publisher's catalog's page). Sequel to Grapefruit''. 2013.

Works by Yoko Ono
1964 books
Artists' books
Fluxworks
Conceptual art
Fluxus